Cape Legoupil is a cape at the northeast side of the entrance to Huon Bay, Trinity Peninsula, Antarctica, terminating in Schmidt Peninsula. It was discovered by a French expedition under Captain Jules Dumont d'Urville, 1837–40, and named for artist Ernest Goupil, who died on the expedition. The incorrect form Legoupil has been used so extensively that in this special case it is accepted. It is the site of the Chilean research station Base General Bernardo O'Higgins Riquelme.

See also
Montravel Rock, 11 nautical miles (20 km) northwest of Cape Legoupil

References

External links

Headlands of Trinity Peninsula